Álvaro José Solís Lonazo (born 26 July 1981) is a retired Colombian football (soccer) player. He last played as a goalkeeper for Patriotas in the Copa Mustang.

He was once the #1 choice keeper for the La Equidad, having arrived from Independiente Santa Fe after they acquired Colombia national football team goalie Agustín Julio.

External links
Profile at GolGolGol.net
 
Profile at SoccerPunter

1981 births
Living people
Footballers from Cali
Colombian footballers
Patriotas Boyacá footballers
Independiente Santa Fe footballers
La Equidad footballers
Real Cartagena footballers
Association football goalkeepers